Tame is a surname. Notable people with the surname include:

Chris Tame (1949–2006), British libertarian political activist
David Tame (born 1953), British author
Grace Tame (born 1994), Australian activist and 2021 Australian of the Year
Jack Tame (born 1987), New Zealand television and radio journalist
John Tame (c. 1430-1500), British merchant
Johnny Tame (born 1947), German singer-songwriter and guitarist
Kevin Tame (born 1931), Australian rules footballer
Michael Tame (born 1956), Australian cricketer